The Ghostfaces is the sixth installment in the Brotherband novel series by Australian author John Flanagan. It was released on 14 June 2016 in the United States. In this sixth book in the action-packed Brotherband Chronicles, the Herons find themselves in unfamiliar lands and prepare for battle with a ruthless, unknown enemy.

Summary 

Hal and his crew are getting a treaty signed with Hibernia for ships and are coming home when a storm blows them off course. They are swept out into the Endless Ocean and after eight days, are running short on water and decide their only chance for survival lies in going west, farther into the ocean.

Delirious with thirst, they see a tree branch and a seagull and in their state they don't realize that they must be approaching land. 

More coming soon
When the Brotherband crew are caught in a massive storm at sea, they’re blown far off course and wash up on the shores of a land so far west that Hal can’t recognize it from any of his maps. Eerily, the locals are nowhere in sight, yet the Herons have a creeping feeling they are being watched.
Suddenly the silence is broken when a massive, marauding bear appears, advancing on two children. The crew springs into action and rescues the children from the bear’s clutches, which earns them the gratitude and friendship of the local Mawagansett tribe, who finally reveal themselves. But the peace is short-lived. The Ghostfaces, a ruthless, warlike tribe who shave their heads and paint their faces white, are on the warpath once more. It’s been ten years since they raided the Mawagansett village, but they’re coming back to pillage and reap destruction. As the enemy approaches, the Herons gear up to help their new friends repel an invasion.

In this sixth book in the action-packed Brotherband Chronicles, the Herons find themselves in unfamiliar lands and prepare for battle with a ruthless, unknown enemy.

External links 
 The Ghostfaces at Penguin Random House (UK)
 The Ghostfaces at Penguin Random House Australia
 The Ghostfaces at Random House (USA)
 The Ghostfaces at Goodreads.com

2016 Australian novels
Australian fantasy novels
Brotherband books
Random House books
Philomel Books books